Lake View Cemetery is a historic cemetery in the city of Ithaca, in Tompkins County, New York named for its original view of nearby Lake Cayuga.

History
The cemetery was established in 1894. It includes an Egyptian Revival style mausoleum / receiving vault, a distinctive serpentine road system and architectural works by William Henry Miller and Liberty Hyde Bailey.

Lake View Cemetery was hit with a series of embezzlement scandals in the twenty-first century. In 2006, a groundskeeper pled guilty to stealing $87,709 from the cemetery. In 2014, a former caretaker and president of Lake View Cemetery was charged with embezzling over $50,000 and "selling or giving away" much of the cemetery's equipment.

Notable burials
Given its proximity to Cornell University, the cemetery includes a number of significant figures from the university's history, including members of the Cornell family, and the graves of faculty members.

 Liberty Hyde Bailey (1858–1954). American horticulturalist and designer.
 Ethel Zoe Bailey (1889–1983) American botanist and curator
 Juanita Breckenridge Bates (1860–1946). American suffragist and early woman ordained as a minister.
 Sophronia Bucklin (1828–1902). American Civil War nurse.
 John "Honest John" Clapp (1851–1904). Early American baseball player and manager.
 Robert Gilmour Dobie (1878–1948). American football player and record-setting coach
 Estevan Antonio Fuertes (1838–1903). Cornell astronomer and namesake of Fuertes Observatory
 Louis Agassiz Fuertes (1874–1927). American ornithologist, illustrator and artist
 James R. Houck (1940–2015). Pioneer of infrared observational astronomy 
 William Henry Miller (1848–1922). American architect
 Carl Sagan (1934–1996). American astronomer, cosmologist, astrophysicist, astrobiologist, author, science popularizer

References

1894 establishments in New York (state)
Cornell University
Cornell family
Cemeteries in Tompkins County, New York